is a Japanese football player currently playing for Oita Trinita.

Club statistics
Updated to 25 February 2019.

References

External links
Profile at Oita Trinita

Profile at Giravanz Kitakyushu

1991 births
Living people
Association football people from Fukuoka Prefecture
Japanese footballers
J1 League players
J2 League players
J3 League players
Oita Trinita players
Tokyo Verdy players
Nagoya Grampus players
V-Varen Nagasaki players
Giravanz Kitakyushu players
Association football defenders